A database catalog of a database instance consists of metadata in which definitions of database objects such as base tables, views (virtual tables), synonyms, value ranges, indexes, users, and user groups are stored.

The SQL standard specifies a uniform means to access the catalog, called the INFORMATION_SCHEMA, but not all databases follow this, even if they implement other aspects of the SQL standard. For an example of database-specific metadata access methods, see Oracle metadata.

See also 
 Data dictionary

References

Database theory